Wyndham is the northernmost town in the Kimberley region of Western Australia, on the Great Northern Highway,  northeast of Perth. It was established in 1886 to service a new goldfield at Halls Creek, and it is now a port and service centre for the east Kimberley with a population of 941 as of the 2021 census. Aboriginal and Torres Strait Islander people make up 54% of the population. Wyndham is part of the Shire of Wyndham-East Kimberley.

History

Wyndham is within traditional Doolboong country.

The first European to visit the area was Phillip Parker King in 1819. He was instructed to find a river 'likely to lead to an interior navigation into the great continent'. He sailed into Cambridge Gulf, which he named after the Duke of Cambridge, and then sailed up a river which was subsequently named after him. Finding no fresh water on the mudflats, he departed.

Wyndham was established on 14 April 1886, by Government Resident and Warden Charles Danvers Price, who led a party including Commissioner of Crown Lands John Forrest on the Adelaide Steamship Company mail steamer SS Albany.

Government Resident Price selected Wyndham as the name for the new town, after Walter George Wyndham, the young stepson of the Governor of Western Australia Sir Frederick Napier Broome.

By late-1886, the town was booming and there were three hotels at the port, one of which was a two-storey building, and two taverns at Three Mile Camp, as well as stores, bootmakers' and butchers' shops, a billiard room, a soda water factory, commission agencies, auctioneers and other businesses.
Ships brought in at least five thousand miners who headed off to the Halls Creek goldfields. It is known that during this boom there were times when up to 16 vessels were moored in Cambridge Gulf.

However, by 1888, the gold rush at Halls Creek had ended and the fortunes of Wyndham declined. Wyndham became a tiny settlement serving the pastoral interests in the East Kimberley. By 1912, money had virtually disappeared from the Wyndham economy, and purchases were paid for using promissory notes known as "shinplasters".

In 1942, during World War II, the town and its aerodrome were attacked on four occasions by Japanese aircraft.

Wyndham's significance as a service centre was crucial for the construction of the Ord River Diversion Dam and the town of Kununurra in the early 1960s. With the rise of Kununurra as a larger population centre the significance of Wyndham as a service centre had diminished by the 1980s. Wyndham has regained significance as the port for the region with new mines shipping ore from the port.

Wyndham Meatworks
In 1913, the Western Australian government started to construct the Wyndham Meatworks to restart the town's economy. The construction efforts were interrupted by the Nevanas affair and World War I, but the meatworks were completed in 1919 to a design by William Hardwick who later became the Principal Architect of Western Australia.
The meatworks were the mainstay of the town's economy until their closure in 1985; the town also supported the Air Beef Scheme which ran from 1947 to 1965.

Geography
Wyndham is on the eastern side of Cambridge Gulf, an inlet of Joseph Bonaparte Gulf in the Timor Sea. It is surrounded by the Durack, Pentecost and King rivers to the south, Forrest River to the west and Ord River to the north. Much of the land around Wyndham is inhospitable, and includes the Bastion Range and the mudflats of the Cambridge Gulf.  The Bastion Range is the site of the  Wyndham Important Bird Area, identified as such by BirdLife International because it holds the largest known population of endangered Gouldian finches.

Climate
Wyndham experiences a hot semi-arid climate (Köppen climate classification BSh), being a little too dry to be classified as a tropical savanna climate (Aw), with a wet season from late November to March and a dry season from April to early November. The wet season is very humid with the average dewpoint temperature at 3pm in February being .

Large rain events do occur in Wyndham, such as on 4 March 1919 when  of rain were recorded over a 24-hour period, followed by another  the next day.

Facilities

Education
There are two schools, Wyndham District High School (K-12) & St Joseph's Catholic School (K-7), one TAFE campus, and a daycare centre.

Transport
Wyndham is served by Wyndham Airport.

Community
The Wyndham Memorial Swimming Pool is a public swimming pool, which was opened on 5 November 1966 by Charles Court.

The Ted Birch Memorial Youth and Recreation Centre is a multi-purpose, community recreation facility. The centre, originally the Wyndham Recreation Centre, was opened on 11 October 2003 by the Shire President Barbara Johnson. The Centre was renamed on 29 May 2014 in honour of Pastor Edward "Ted" Birch. Ted Birch was instrumental in helping establish a youth service in Wyndham.

Peter Reid Memorial Hall is a community hall in Wyndham available for community events and private bookings.  The hall, originally the Wyndham Hall, was built in 1982 and was later renamed the Peter Reid Memorial Hall in recognition of Peter Reid's service to the community by the Wyndham Lions Club following his death in 1985.

Tourism
For tourists, there are two hotels and a caravan park. The nearby Bastion lookout provides sweeping vistas of the surrounding country including the five rivers named above which emerge into the Cambridge Gulf. The town has a museum in the old courthouse that is open to the public and run by the Wyndham Historical Society. Nearby Wyndham is the Boab Prison Tree.

In popular culture
The Wyndham area was a filming location for:
 The 1946 film The Overlanders
 The 1997 Documentary film The Human Race
 The 2004 US reality TV series Outback Jack, at El Questro Station
 The 2007 Dutch reality TV series Outback Jack, at Home Valley Station
 The 2008 film Australia
 The 2010 film Mad Bastards, as the fictional town of Five Rivers
 The 2012 film Satellite Boy, in and around Wyndham
 The 2013 TV series Who Do You Think You Are?, Series 5 Episode 1, Rove McManus
 The 2018 TV series Mystery Road, as the fictional town of Patterson

References

External links

 travel guide
 Shire of Wyndam-East Kimberley homepage
 Kununurra Historical Society Archive, Library, Museum & Research has links to images of Wyndham.

1886 establishments in Australia
Cambridge Gulf
Mining towns in Western Australia
Populated places established in 1886
Port cities in Western Australia